Luna Park may refer to one of two parks located in Coney Island:
Luna Park (Coney Island, 1903)
Luna Park (Coney Island, 2010)